Bartolomé Tavera Acosta (1865–1931) was a Venezuelan journalist and historian.  He is considered a pioneer of ethnology and linguistics in modern Venezuela.

1865 births
1931 deaths
Venezuelan journalists
19th-century Venezuelan historians